

History 
Proudman, also recorded as Proud, Proude and Prout, is a surname that originated in medieval England but also had one occurrence in Scotland. Proudman was originally used as a nickname for a person who takes pride in their work or family. You may hear this surname associated with the country Northumberland which is a misconception as it most likely originated in the country of Cornwall.

The earliest traces of this name can be found in the early 11th century.

Today, the surname Proudman is not very common, ranking as the 350,215th most common surname in the world. The places where the surname Proudman is most common include; England (591 incidences),  The United States (236 incidences) and  Australia (91 incidences).

Proudman is an English surname which may refer to:
Christopher Proudman (born 1952), English cricketer
Joseph Proudman (1888–1975), British mathematician and oceanographer
Maureen Patey (Eyre) Proudman (1906–1989), English designer and painter
Sonia Proudman (born 1949), judge of the High Court of England and Wales

References